Martin Prokop (born 4 October 1982) is a Czech rally driver. He won the Junior World Rally Championship in the 2009 season.

Career

After competing in the Czech Rally Championship for four years, Prokop debuted in the World Rally Championship at the 2005 Monte Carlo Rally, finishing ninth in the Junior World Rally Championship (JWRC) category. He ended his season with the same position in the overall junior standings. In the 2006 season, Prokop took his first JWRC win at the Rally Catalunya and finished tenth in the championship.

In 2007, Prokop continued in the junior class and won the Rallye Deutschland and the Tour de Corse. In the overall standings, he placed third behind the two Swifts of Per-Gunnar Andersson and Urmo Aava. In the 2008 season, Prokop contested both the JWRC and the Production World Rally Championship (PWRC), finishing third and fifth, respectively.

In 2009, Prokop continued competing in both WRC support championships. In August 2009, he secured the junior world title with a win at the Rally Finland, after earlier driving his Citroën C2 S1600 to victory in Cyprus and Italy. He finished 2nd in PWRC 2009 standings after Armindo Araujo.

In 2010, Prokop switched to SWRC with Ford Fiesta S2000. He is first driver who won special stage of WRC rally with s2000 car, it was SS16 at 2010 Rally Sweden. Prokop had strong results during the season 3rd at Rally Sweden, 2nd at Rally Mexico, Rallye Deutschland and Rally Japan. Prokop had chances to become SWRC champion at Rallye de France, but because of his problems with power steering he was losing time every stage and finished 6th.

In 2016, Martin Prokop started at Dakar Rally, competing fellow debuting world rally drivers Mikko Hirvonen and Sébastien Loeb. He missed first two rallies of the season but joined at 2016 Rally Mexico and finished 7th.

Racing record

WRC results
 
* Season still in progress

JWRC results

PWRC results

SWRC results

WRC-Trophy results

WRC-2 results

* Season still in progress.

IRC results

Czech Rally Championship results

Dakar Rally results

References

External links

 Official website
 

1982 births
Czech rally drivers
Living people
World Rally Championship drivers
Dakar Rally drivers
Sportspeople from Jihlava
24H Series drivers
Czech racing drivers
M-Sport drivers